The men's triple jump event at the 2002 African Championships in Athletics was held in Radès, Tunisia on August 10.

Results

References

2002 African Championships in Athletics
Triple jump at the African Championships in Athletics